Hogenakkal Falls ('ஒகேனக்கல் அருவி', 'ಹೊಗೇನಕಲ್ ಜಲಪಾತ') is a waterfall in South India on the Kaveri river on the border between Dharmapuri district of Tamil Nadu and Chamrajnagar district of Karnataka. It is sometimes referred to as the "Niagara Falls of India," it is known for bathing areas and hired boat rides and as a major tourist attraction. Carbonatite rocks in this site are considered to be the oldest of its kind in South Asia and one of the oldest in the world. The Government of Tamil Nadu made a proposal to convert the falls into providing drinking water for the state.

Etymology
The pure Tamil name of Hogenakkal Falls is Uguneer Kal (உகுநீர் கல்). It was under the rule of Mysore Kingdom from 1652 to 1768 and during that period many Kannadas were employed and settled here in large numbers for tax collection work. Due to this reason, many Tamil names there became Kannada names.That is how Uguneer Kal(உகுநீர் கல்) became Hogenakkal. The name Hogenakal is derived from Kannada means ‘Smoky Rocks’. The river when falls on the rock below, the gushing force of water resembles like smoke emanating from the rocks. It is also called as Marikottayam by the people of Tamil Nadu.

History 
Hogenakkal falls is mentioned in Sangam Literature as Thalaineer aruvi (தலைநீர் அருவி). All the areas around this waterfalls are called Thalaineer Naadu (தலைநீர் நாடு). It was ruled by the King named Adiyaman Neduman Anji. References to this King and the Falls are found in the Sangam Literatures like Purananooru (புறநானூறு), Agananooru (அகநானூறு), Kurunthogai (குறுந்தொகை) etc.

River

The Kaveri is considered to form at Talakaveri in the Brahmagiri hills in the Western Ghats of south India and gathers momentum as the land drops in elevation. It becomes larger as various tributaries feed into it on the way down. At Hogenakkal, the Kaveri, now a large river, drops and creates numerous waterfalls as the water cuts through the rocky terrain. The river carries sediment which makes the downriver land fertile.
Built in 1934, this project improved irrigation and provided hydropower.

Weather

The best season to visit is soon after the monsoons, when the river is in full spate. But some tourists prefer to visit during off-season to skip the crowd.

Boating

Boating in Hogenakkal is allowed during the dry-season as the falls are not strong enough to disrupt the passage of the boats. This is the main source of income for boat operators. These coracles are made of bamboo, and with all materials available takes about a day to build. The bottom of the boats are made waterproof by the use of hides, but sometimes with sheets of plastic. Use of plastics in the Hogenakkal vicinity, not just for boats, has been criticised due to problems with pollution. These boats are steered and propelled using a single paddle, making them unique.

Freshly caught fish are sold by the gorge and also various vendors selling water and snacks up and down the gorge rowing their coracles is not uncommon. After leaving the gorge, on the left shore one can find improvised stalls set up on the sand. There, one can let the fresh fishes be prepared in one of the many kitchens. Also, many people can be found swimming or bathing around there.

Hogenakkal water project

Hogenakal Falls is the location for the Hogenakkal Integrated Drinking Water Project proposed by the Tamil Nadu Government. The objective of this project is to provide safe drinking water to the urban and rural areas in Krishnagiri and Dharmapuri districts. In February 2008, The Japan Bank for International Cooperation agreed to fund the Rs 1,340-crore project.

Gallery

See also
List of waterfalls in India
Hogenakkal

References

External links

 Protest against `encroachment' of island near Hogenekal Falls

Kaveri River
Dharmapuri district
Waterfalls of Tamil Nadu
Internal territorial disputes
Tourist attractions in Chamarajanagar district
Waterfalls of Karnataka